S. Husky Höskulds (born in Iceland) is an audio engineer based in Los Angeles, California.

Biography 
Husky Höskulds moved to Los Angeles in 1991 to study audio engineering at the University of California, Los Angeles. He began his career working with Mitchell Froom and Tchad Blake as a staff engineer at The Sound Factory in the early 1990s but would quickly move on to independent projects with Michael Penn, The Wallflowers, Sheryl Crow, Tom Waits and a steady collaboration with Mike Patton on his various projects. Also important was the work with the producers Craig Street and Joe Henry, for whom he also recorded and mixed two of his own albums. In 2002 he won a Grammy for Best Engineered Album, Non-Classical alongside Jay Newland for the multiple awarded debut album Come Away with Me by Norah Jones co-produced by Craig Street.

Groundlift.org 

In 2009 Husky founded the online artist community Groundlift.org. In an effort to bring together like-minded artists and collaborators, Groundlift is now host to more than 40 artists worldwide, including over 50 albums and other digital artwork and has been tapped for several soundtracks and collaborations.

Mission 
Groundlift is a creative platform, an online community and forum for forward thinking and open minded artists and art lovers. A catalyst in the creation, distribution  and sales of all types of digital art, audio and visual… music, photography, video, short films, animation and more.

Groundlift Studios 
Leveraging the latest in digital technology, Husky and his Groundlift team currently operate studios in Los Angeles, Reykjavik and Paris. This international presence further enhances the online community idea, and allows for unparalleled creative freedom and collaboration.

Discography 
(Sorted by artist)

Höskulds also worked with Fiona Apple, Susana Baca, Sverrir Bergman, Doyle Bramhall, Edie Brickell, Tracy Chapman, The Derek Trucks Band, Devo, Dr Spock, French for Cartridge, Terra Grimard, Earl Harvin, The Holmes Brothers, Jubilant Sykes, Gabriel Kahane, Wouter Kellerman,  Laus, Josh Lopez, Aimee Mann, Emi Meyer, Minus, Eliza Moore, My Brightest Diamond, Dave Palmer, Vanessa Paradis, Ann Peebles, Sam Phillips, David Piltch and Friends, Billy Preston, Skinny Puppy, Susheela Raman, Toshi Reagon, Hemlock Smith, Mavis Staples, Jennifer Terran, Irma Thomas, Richard Thompson, Amali Ward and others.

References

External links 
 Official site
 Artist Community

Icelandic audio engineers
Living people
People from Los Angeles
UCLA School of the Arts and Architecture alumni
1969 births